A-Boy Supply is a chain of plumbing and electrical supply stores located in the Pacific Northwest United States.  This privately held company is headquartered in Portland, Oregon. The company has 3 stores in Oregon. They specialize in plumbing and electrical supplies, but they also have a mix of products similar to a neighborhood hardware store.  The largest A-Boy store is the Barbur Boulevard location  and it also has a seasonal plant nursery, and lumber. They also sell a limited selection of their product line, mostly faucets, via their website.

History

A-Boy Supply was founded by John Dolan in 1960 in a former grocery store in southeast Portland, Oregon. They first sold plumbing fixtures, electrical supplies and appliances. Lighting products and lighting supplies were added later. In 1962 he opened a second store in Milton-Freewater, Oregon- 300 miles away from the first store in Portland, Oregon. Although the store did well, distance made management difficult and, in 1969, John sold it.

The family then directed focus on developing stores in the Portland metro area beginning with a store in Tigard, Oregon. In November 1975, 2 stores were opened.  One in Beaverton, Oregon, and one in the Northeast Portland Hollywood neighborhood. The Vancouver, Washington store opened just in time for the 1980 eruption of Mount St. Helens. The Hillsboro, Oregon store was opened in 1984 and the Portland Northwest Vaughn Street store in 1996.

In July 2009, two months after announcing plans to liquidate their stores, the president of A-Boy Supply Co. bought out his family members and reopened 5 of the company's 6 stores, all of the Oregon locations.

Supreme Court Case: Dolan v. City of Tigard 

A 1991 application to the City of Tigard to redevelop the Tigard A-Boy store site was halted due to a dispute with the city of Tigard. After John Dolan died in 1993, his wife Florence Dolan pursued the case to the US Supreme Court. In June 1994, she won the Supreme Court decision Dolan v. City of Tigard, that found the City of Tigard in violation of the Fifth Amendment to the United States Constitution.

After the court victory, and a delay in collecting restitution from the city, the new store was completed in 1999.

See also
 List of companies based in Oregon

Notes

References
Company History taken from the A-Boy Supply website, via the Internet Archive.
 Illinois Municipal Review / November 1994
Realtor.org

External links 
 A-Boy Plumbing & Electrical Supply website

Hardware stores of the United States
Companies based in Portland, Oregon
Retail companies established in 1960
1960 establishments in Oregon
Privately held companies based in Oregon
American companies established in 1960